The Escola Bahiana de Medicina e Saúde Pública (Bahian School of Medicine and Public Health, known simply as Bahiana) is a private and non-profit higher education school of medical sciences and health, established in 1952 in Salvador, Bahia, Brazil. It is one of the most important educational institutions of Northeastern Brazil and has been recognized for its achievements in research and large contribution to public health – with more than 600,000 free care procedures performed in 2012.

Bahiana currently offers seven undergraduate courses and post-graduate programs in several fields of health sciences. The school is maintained by the Fundação Bahiana para Desenvolvimento das Ciências (Bahian Foundation for Science Development).

History 
After noticing the health care needs of Bahian society in the beginning of the 1950s, a group of doctors, academics, public managers and religious leaders from Salvador ideated a new institution. At that time, the only medical school in the state was the Faculdade de Medicina da Bahia, which graduated 130 professionals per year.

Facing such a situation, Antônio Simões da Silva Freitas, Orlando de Castro Lima, Jorge Valente, Aristides Novis Filho, Adelaido Ribeiro, Antônio Souza Lima Machado, Colombo Moreira Spínola, Urcício Santiago, André Negreiros Falcão, Francisco Pinheiro Lima Junior, Manoel Aquino Barbosa and René Alfredo Guimarães created the Escola Bahiana de Medicina e Saúde Pública.

On May 31, 1952, they signed the minutes that established the Fundação Bahiana para Desenvolvimento das Ciências, whose mission was to support and provide funds for the new school - that would be located at the same building of the Santa Izabel Hospital, in Nazaré's district.

The first group of teachers was chosen in January 1953. Admission exams were taken on April 14 of the same year. Later that month, Aristides Novis Filho gave the first lessons for the Medicine course. The first class graduated in 1958.

During the following decades, Bahiana expanded its activities to provide public health care assistance. In the 70's, an area of 6,500 m2 was bought in Brotas neighborhood. Years later, the building of the former Santa Terezinha Preventorium was bought to place Bahiana's first health care centre, the Ambulatório Docente-Assistencial da Bahiana (ADAB). In 1998, a new building situated near ADAB was built to become Bahiana's second campus: the Brotas Academic Unit.

In 1999, Bahiana opened the Cabula Academic Unit, located in a vast green space in the district of Cabula.

It is dedicated to some free of charge health services.

Academic units 
Bahiana's academic activities are held in two units, located in the districts of Brotas and Cabula.

Brotas 
At the Brotas Academic Unit, there are held undergraduate and postgraduate programs activities. Near it, it is located the Ambulatório Docente-Assistencial da Bahiana, where a multidisciplinary team of professionals, teachers and students from diverse fields work together to provide free health care services.

Cabula 
Cabula's academic unit is the home for the Biomedicine, Medicine, Dentistry and Nursery courses. Built on a green area with 70,000 m2, it hosts the majority of Bahiana's main events, such as the Mostra Científica e Cultural (Science and Culture Exhibition), the Pedagogic Forum, the Nursery, Biomedicine and Dentistry journeys, admission exams and freshman welcome receptions.

Undergraduate programs 
 Medicine
 Physical therapy
 Psychology
 Dentistry
 Biomedicine
 Nursery
 Physical Education

Post-Graduate programs 
Bahiana offers several post-graduate courses, including Master of Science and Doctoral programs. The school also has 32 research groups registered on CNPq Lattes platform.

Admissions 
Since 2008, undergraduates have to pass through an admission process called Processo Seletivo Formativo (PROSEF), which allows them to experience their future profession and interact with teachers and classmates.

Health care centres 
ADAB Brotas - Ambulatório Docente-Assistencial Multiprofissional (general services)
ADAB Cabula - Ambulatório Docente-Assistencial Odontológico (dental services)
Centro Integrado e Multidisciplinar de HTLV e Hepatites Virais 
CAFIS - Clínica Avançada em Fisioterapia (Physical Therapy)
SEPSI - Serviço de Psicologia (Psychology)
SerTO - Serviço de Terapia Ocupacional (Occupational Therapy)

Scientific publications 
Brazilian Journal of Medicine and Human Health
Revista Pesquisa em Fisioterapia (Research in Physical Therapy)
Revista Enfermagem Contemporânea (Contemporary Nursery)
Revista Psicologia, Diversidade e Saúde (Psychology, Diversity and Health)
Revista Bahiana de Odontologia (Bahian Journal of Odontology)

References

Universities and colleges in Bahia
Educational institutions established in 1952
1952 establishments in Brazil
Medical schools in Brazil